Artem Yuriyovych Biesiedin (born 31 March 1996) is a Ukrainian professional footballer who plays as a striker for Omonia, on loan from Dynamo Kyiv.

Club career
Biesiedin is a product of different sportive school systems. His first trainer was Yuriy Prydybaylo. From 3 March 2015 he played on loan for FC Metalist and made his debut in the Ukrainian Premier League in the match against FC Dynamo Kyiv on 1 March 2015.

International career
In November 2016, Biesiedin received his first call-up to the senior Ukraine squad for matches against Finland and Serbia.
On 15 November 2016, he made his debut for the national team in the friendly match against Serbia, coming on as a substitute. On 17 November 2019 Biesiedin scored his second goal for the national team in the UEFA Euro 2020 qualification match against Serbia in Belgrade.

Career statistics

Club

International

International goals
Scores and results list Ukraine's goal tally first.

Honours
Dynamo Kyiv
Ukrainian Premier League: 2020–21
Ukrainian Cup: 2020–21

References

External links
 
 

1996 births
Living people
Footballers from Kharkiv
Association football forwards
Ukrainian footballers
Ukraine youth international footballers
Ukraine under-21 international footballers
Ukraine international footballers
FC Dynamo Kyiv players
FC Metalist Kharkiv players
Ukrainian Premier League players
UEFA Euro 2020 players
Doping cases in association football
Kharkiv State College of Physical Culture 1 alumni